William Vane may refer to: 

 William Vane, 1st Viscount Vane (1682–1734), British peer
 William Vane, 2nd Viscount Vane (1714–1789), British peer
 William Vane, 1st Duke of Cleveland (1766–1842), British peer
 William Vane, 3rd Duke of Cleveland (1792–1864), British peer
 William Vane, 1st Baron Inglewood (1909–1989), British peer